The Peach Blossom Open was a golf tournament on the LPGA Tour from 1953 to 1966. It was played at the Spartanburg Country Club in Spartanburg, South Carolina. Betsy Rawls, Spartanburg native, hosted the event.

Winners
Peach Blossom Invitational
1966 Carol Mann

Peach Blossom Open
1965 Marilynn Smith

Peach Blossom Invitational
1964 Mickey Wright

Peach Blossom Open
1963 Marilynn Smith
1962 Mary Lena Faulk
1961 Ruth Jessen

Betsy Rawls Peach Blossom Open
1960 Wiffi Smith

Betsy Rawls Open
1959 Wiffi Smith

Peach Blossom Open
1958 Wiffi Smith
1957 Betsy Rawls
1956 Betsy Rawls
1955 Babe Zaharias

Betsy Rawls Open
1954 Louise Suggs
1953 Louise Suggs

References

Former LPGA Tour events
Recurring sporting events established in 1953
Recurring events disestablished in 1966
Golf in South Carolina
Women's sports in South Carolina